Richard Fort may refer to:

Richard Fort (Liberal politician, born 1822) (1822–1868), English politician, MP for Clitheroe, 1865–1868
Richard Fort (Liberal politician, born 1856) (1856–1918), English politician, MP for Clitheroe, 1880–1885
Richard Fort (Conservative politician) (1907–1959), English politician, MP for Clitheroe,1950–1959